Bosto Kingtee is a family of products by Bosto International, a brand that specializes in the production of pen displays (a specific kind of Graphics tablet with an embedded LCD monitor).

Models

13HD
This tablet is the smallest model in the family and has a 13-inch screen with 8 keys. It uses a pen stylus that is similar to the 22U mini. The resolution is 1920x1080 and has a H-IPS LED screen.

14WA 
The second smallest model in the family and the oldest still in production, it has a 14-inch screen with 10 keys and a scroll wheel on each side. It has had at least two different versions, an older one released in 2012 with a pen stylus powered by an AAAA battery and a newer version released in 2014 with battery-less pen stylus.

19MA 
This model has a 19-inch screen with 8 keys and a scroll wheel on the left hand side only. It was introduced in 2011 on the Asian market. It featured a battery-less pen stylus. It was discontinued in early 2014 when the 22HD was released.

19MB 
Released in 2012, this is a lighter version of the 19MA, without the side keys and scroll wheel, while retaining the same battery-less pen stylus present in the 19MA. It was discontinued on 2014 after the release of the 22HD.

22HD+ 
Originally released under the name of 22HD in 2013, it had some fabrication problems, which led to a factory replacement of all units sold and a renaming to 22HD+. It has a H-IPS full HD screen and a battery-less triangular pen with eraser on the back.

22HDX 
Released in 2014, this is internally the same as 22HD+, featuring the same screen and pen, while adding an external case that is very similar to the 14WA (having the same 10 keys and a scroll wheel per side pattern as the smallest model and the bottom curved shape)

22U mini 
Released in the middle of 2014, it uses a different digitizer technology with a slim version of the H-IPS screen, making it more compact.

References

Computing input devices